Ufuk is a unisex Turkish given name meaning "horizon". It stems from the Arabic ufuq (أفق), having the same meaning, as does the corresponding Hebrew name "אופק". The name may refer to:

People
Ufuk Bayraktar (born 1981), Turkish actor
Ufuk Budak (born 1990), Azerbaijani football player
Ufuk Ceylan (born 1986), Turkish football player
Ufuk S. Erguen (born 1967), German Business Angel
Ufuk Özbek (born 1992), Turkish-German football player
Ufuk Sarıca (born 1972), Turkish basketball coach
Ufuk Talay (born 1976), Australian football player
Ufuk Uras (born 1959), Turkish politician

See also
Ufuk University, Turkey

Notes

Unisex given names
Turkish unisex given names